Rubidium-82 (82Rb) is a radioactive isotope of rubidium. 82Rb is widely used in myocardial perfusion imaging. This isotope undergoes rapid uptake by myocardiocytes, which makes it a valuable tool for identifying myocardial ischemia in Positron Emission Tomography (PET) imaging. 82Rb is used in the pharmaceutical industry and is marketed as Rubidium-82 chloride under the trade names RUBY-FILL and CardioGen-82.

History
In 1953, it was discovered that rubidium carried a biological activity that was comparable to potassium. In 1959, preclinical trials showed in dogs that myocardial uptake of this radionuclide was directly proportional to myocardial blood flow. In 1979, Yano et al. compared several ion-exchange columns to be used in an automated 82Sr/82Rb generator for clinical testing. Around 1980, pre-clinical trials began using 82Rb in PET. In 1982, Selwyn et al. examined the relation between myocardial perfusion and rubidium-82 uptake during acute ischemia in six dogs after coronary stenosis and in five volunteers and five patients with coronary artery disease. Myocardial tomograms, recorded at rest and after exercise in the volunteers showed homogeneous uptake in reproducible and repeatable scans. Rubidium-82 has shown considerable accuracy, comparable to that of 99mTc-SPECT. In 1989, the FDA approved the 82Rb/82Sr generator for commercial use in the U.S. With increased 82Sr production capabilities, the use of 82Rb has increased over the last 10 years and is now approved by several health authorities worldwide.

Production

Rubidium-82 is produced through beta plus decay from its parent nucleus, strontium-82. The generator contains accelerator produced 82Sr adsorbed on stannic oxide in a lead-shielded column and provides a means for obtaining sterile nonpyrogenic solutions of RbCl(Halide salt form capable of injection). The amount (millicuries) of 82Rb obtained in each elution will depend on the potency of the generator. When eluted at a rate of 50 mL/minute, each generator eluate at the end of elution should not contain more than 0.02 microcuries of strontium 82Sr and not more than 0.2 microcuries of 85Sr per millicurie of 82RbCl injection, and not more than 1 microgram of tin per mL of eluate.

Pharmacology

Mechanism of action
82Rb has activity very similar to that of a potassium ion (K+). Once in the myocardium, it is an active participant in the sodium-potassium exchange pump of cells. It is rapidly extracted by the myocardium proportional to blood flow. Its radioactivity is increased in viable myocardial cells reflecting cellular retention, while the tracer is cleared rapidly from necrotic or infarcted tissue.

Pharmacodynamics
When tested clinically, 82Rb is seen in the myocardium within the first minute of intravenous injection. When the myocardium is affected with ischemia or infarction, they will be visualized between 2–7 minutes. These affected areas will be shown as photon deficient on the PET scan. 82Rb passes through the entire body on the first pass of circulation and has visible uptake in organs such as the kidney, liver, spleen and lung. This is due to the high vascularity of those organs.

Use in PET
Rubidium is rapidly extracted from the blood and is taken up by the myocardium in relation to myocardial perfusion, which requires energy for myocardial uptake through Na+/K+-ATPase similar to thallium-201. 82Rb is capable of producing a clear perfusion image similar to single photon emission computed tomography(SPECT)-MPI because it is an extractable tracer. The short half-life requires rapid image acquisition shortly after tracer administration, which reduces total study time. The short half-life also allows for less radiation experienced by the patient. A standard visual perfusion imaging assessment is based on defining regional uptake relative to the maximum uptake in the myocardium. Importantly, 82Rb PET also seems to provide prognostic value in patients who are obese and whose diagnosis remains uncertain after SPECT-MPI.

82Rb myocardial blood flow quantification is expected to improve the detection of multivessel coronary heart disease. 82Rb/PET is a valuable tool in ischemia identification. Myocardial Ischemia is an inadequate blood supply to the heart. 82Rb/PET can be used to quantify the myocardial flow reserve in the ventricles which then allows the medical professional to make an accurate diagnosis and prognosis of the patient. Various vasoreactivity studies are made possible through 82Rb/PET imaging due to its quantification of myocardial blood flow. It is possible to quantify stress in patients under the same reasoning. Recently it has been shown that neuroendocrine tumor metastasis can be imaged with 82Rb due to its ability to quantify myocardial blood flow (MBF) during rest and pharmacological stress, commonly performed with adenosine.

Advantages

One of the main advantages of 82Rb is its availability in nuclear medicine departments. This isotope is available after 10-minute elution of a 82Sr column; this makes it possible to produce enough samples to inject about 10–15 patients a day. Another advantage of 82Rb would be its high count density in myocardial tissue. 82Rb/PET has shown greater uniformity and count density than 99mTc-SPECT when examining the myocardium. This results in higher interpretive confidence and greater accuracy. It allows for quantification of coronary flow reserve and myocardial blood flow. 82Rb also has an advantage in that it has a very short half-life which results in much lower radiation exposure for the patient. This is especially important as the use of myocardial imaging increases in the medical field. When it comes to patients, 82Rb is beneficial to use when the patient is obese or physically unable to perform a stress test. It also has side effects limited to minor irritation around the injection site.

Limitations
A serious limitation of 82Rb would be its cost. Currently 99mTc costs on average $70 per dose, needing two doses; whereas 82Rb costs about $250 a dose. Another limitation of this isotope is that it needs a dedicated PET/CT camera, and in places like Europe where a 82Sr/82Rb generator is still yet to be approved that can be hard to find.

References

Further reading
 
 

Rubidium
Isotopes of rubidium
Positron emitters
Cardiac imaging
3D nuclear medical imaging
PET radiotracers
Medical isotopes